Edward Joseph Bowen (12 August 1889 – 2 December 1933) was an Australian rules footballer who played with Carlton and St Kilda in the Victorian Football League (VFL).

Notes

External links 

Ned Bowen's profile at Blueseum		
 

1889 births
1933 deaths
Australian rules footballers from Victoria (Australia)
Carlton Football Club players
St Kilda Football Club players